Trust certificate may refer to:

Public key infrastructure
Trust Certificate (finance)